Panglao may refer to either:
Panglao, Bohol
Panglao Island, on which the above municipality is located.